Brettell is a surname. Notable people with the surname include:

Caroline Brettell (born 1950), American cultural anthropologist
David Brettell (born 1956), English cricketer
Frank Brettell (1862–1936), English-born Irish football player, manager and administrator
Gordon Brettell (1915–1944), British Royal Air Force pilot and prisoner of war, murdered during the "Great Escape"
Jacob Brettell (1793–1862), English unitarian minister

See also
Bretel

External links
 One Name Study on the surname Brettell